Elbe was a  cargo ship that was built in 1921 by Nobiskrug Werft, Rendsburg for German owners. She was seized by the Allies at Copenhagen, Denmark in May 1945, passed to the Ministry of War Transport (MoWT) and renamed Empire Confederation. In 1946, she was transferred to the Soviet Union and renamed José Dias (Хозе Диас). She served until she was scrapped in 1966.

Description
The ship was built in 1912 by Nobiskrug Werft GmbH, Rendsburg.

She had a GRT of 1,197 and a NRT of 641.

The engine was built by Ottensener Maschinenfabrik GmbH, Altona.

History
Elbe was built for Bugsier Reederei & Bergungs AG, Hamburg. Her port of registry was Hamburg and the Code Letters RBVM were allocated. In 1934, her Code Letters were changed to DHGB.

In May 1945, Elbe was seized by the Allies at Copenhagen, Denmark. She was passed to the MoWT and renamed Empire Confederation. Her port of registry was changed to London The Code Letters GKRD and United Kingdom Official Number 180614 were allocated. In 1946, she was allocated to the Soviet Union and renamed José Dias. She was scrapped in 1966.

References

1921 ships
Ships built in Rendsburg
Steamships of Germany
Merchant ships of Germany
World War II merchant ships of Germany
Ministry of War Transport ships
Empire ships
Steamships of the United Kingdom
Steamships of the Soviet Union
Merchant ships of the Soviet Union